The Bonny is the second studio album by the Scottish singer-songwriter and acoustic guitarist Gerry Cinnamon. It was released on 17 April 2020 by Little Runaway Records. The album includes the singles "Canter", "Sun Queen", "Dark Days", "The Bonny", "Where We're Going" and "Head in the Clouds". The re-release also includes the single "Ghost".

Background
In March 2020, Gerry Cinnamon announced that he was releasing his new album The Bonny on 17 April, during the COVID-19 pandemic in Scotland. In November 2020, Cinnamon announced via Instagram that the album was to be re-released on 13 November 2020 including his new single "Ghost", as well as new recordings of "Kampfire Vampire" and "Fickle McSelfish".

Of the re-release, he said: "Been waiting a long time to get those tunes back. Should have been on the first album but that’s what happens when you trust the wrong people. Ghost, Kampfire, Fickle and Roll the Credits were all written around the same time so it’s good to have them all on the same record."

Chart performance 
The Bonny debuted at number 1 on the UK Albums Chart, selling 29,000 units in its first week, 77% of which were made up of physical sales and downloads. It is Cinnamon's first ever chart-topping album in the United Kingdom. The album also sold 6,400 copies on vinyl format in its first week in the UK.  The album also debuted at number 1 on the Irish Albums Chart.

Promotion

Tour
On 6 December 2019, Gerry Cinnamon announced his UK and Ireland tour on his social media profiles. In March 2020, he had to reschedule some of his concerts to later in the year due to the coronavirus pandemic. On 21 May 2020, he announced that he had moved the dates for his UK and Ireland tour to May and June 2021.

Track listing

Charts

Weekly charts

Year-end charts

Certifications

Release history

References

2020 albums
Gerry Cinnamon albums